Baekhyeon-dong (백현동, 柏峴洞) is neighborhood of Bundang district in the city of Seongnam, Gyeonggi Province, South Korea.

Bundang
Neighbourhoods in South Korea